Shanti Sadan School is a small establishment from kindergarten to high school with around 500 students on role. It is located in Dharwad, Karnataka, India.

References

High schools and secondary schools in Maharashtra
Christian schools in Karnataka
Buildings and structures in Karnataka
Educational institutions established in 1992
1992 establishments in Karnataka